The men's 30 kilometre pursuit (15 km classical + 15 km freestyle) at the FIS Nordic World Ski Championships 2009 took place on 22 February 2009 at 13:00 CET at Liberec.

Results

References

External links
Final results International Ski Federation (FIS)

FIS Nordic World Ski Championships 2009